Matthew or Matt Armstrong may refer to:

Matthew Armstrong (Australian footballer) (born 1967), Australian rules football player
Matthew Armstrong (English footballer) (1918/19–1941), English football wing half killed in action in the Second World War
Matt Armstrong (1911–1995), Scottish footballer
Matthew John Armstrong (born 1973), American actor